The Spain national American football team is the official American football senior national team of Spain.

Men's team 
The men's team played four times in the EFAF European Championship. Nowadays, Spain plays in Group C, the third division of the European Championship. They failed to qualify for the 2018 tournament in Germany, losing in the first qualifying round against Israel in their first-ever match 28–20.

Women's team 
The team competed at the 2013 IFAF Women's World Championship, where they finished last after losing to Sweden 64–0.

Results

At World Championship

At European Championship

References 

Women's national American football teams
Men's national American football teams
American football
American football in Spain